Tanjung Balai or Tanjungbalai (often abbreviated Tg. Balai) may refer to:

 Tanjungbalai (city), the independent city which split off from Asahan Regency of North Sumatra, formerly the main part of Tanjung Balai, Asahan
 Tanjung Balai, Asahan, the remaining part left over after the city incorporation, still part of Asahan Regency
 The port of Tanjung Balai on the Asahan River which lies in Asahan Regency but not in the city
 Tanjung Balai Karimun, a port and town of Great Karimun island in Riau Islands province